Robert Foley may refer to:

Robert Foley (academic) (born 1953), British anthropologist and archaeologist
Robert Foley (American politician) (born 1953), politician from Maine
Robert Foley (footballer) (born 1946), Ghanaian footballer
Robert Foley (ironmonger) (1624–1676), English ironmonger and High Sheriff
Robert Foley (priest) (died 1783), Dean of Worcester Cathedral
Robert Foley (MP) (1651–1702), English ironmonger and politician
Robert F. Foley (born 1941), Medal of Honor recipient
Sylvester R. Foley Jr. (1928–2019), known as Bob, American admiral